Penne Percy Korth Peacock (born November 3, 1942) is an American diplomat. She graduated from the University of Texas in 1964 with a B.A.

She is a commissioner of the U.S. Advisory Commission on Public Diplomacy. Nominated in 1997, Korth Peacock previously served as Ambassador to Mauritius from 1989 to 1992. In 1993, Korth Peacock co-founded Firestone and Korth Ltd., a corporate consulting and events management firm in Washington, D.C.

Korth Peacock currently serves on the Boards of Chevy Chase Bank, the Council of American Ambassadors, Meridian International Center, the Van Cliburn Foundation, the Marjorie Merriweather Post Foundation of DC, and the Association for Diplomatic Studies and Training.  She is also Vice Chairman of the Washington Round Table of the Center for Strategic and International Studies (CSIS).

Ambassadorship
Korth Peacock was nominated officially by President George H. W. Bush on August 4, 1989, and presented her credentials as ambassador to Mauritius on December 6, 1989. She succeeded Ronald D. Palmer. At the time she most recently served as co-chair of the American Bicentennial Presidential Inauguration, 1988-1989. Since 1986, Korth has been the senior Washington associate and client liaison and representative of the trust and estate division of Sotheby's. She was relieved of the position on November 19, 1992.

Public diplomacy
In late 2005, the Advisory Commission published its annual report, giving strong recommendations and guidance on the future of U.S. public diplomacy. The group states that in the short term, a central goal is to establish platforms for cross-cultural dialogue, noting that two-way communication is critical to fostering a sense of shared values and trust. The report also provides recommendations on improving long-term communications, including the development of virtual centers for cultural exchange and the establishment of new English language inititiatives. The commission's conclusions highlight the increasing importance of modernizing communications in under-developed nations, providing a critical link for the West to engage its world audience.

Family
Korth Peacock originally married Fritz-Alan Korth and divorced with three children.

Korth Peacock then married the former Australian Liberal Opposition leader Andrew Peacock in 2002, after a long-time companionship.

Peacock, then 63, met Korth Peacock, then 59, at the time the former Texas beauty queen was ambassador to Mauritius, and while he was the Australian Ambassador to the United States from 1997 to 1999. Peacock, who was president of Boeing Australia and lived in Sydney, had only this to say about his third wedding: "It is a very happy occasion."

Korth Peacock and Andrew Peacock most recently resided together in Texas. Andrew Peacock died on April 16, 2021 at the age of 82.

Publications, articles, and commentary
Minutes – Commission Meeting Jan. 2006
2005 Report of the Advisory Commission on Public Diplomacy

References

External links

US Embassy-Israel Press Release
State Department Profiles

1942 births
Living people
Ambassadors of the United States to Mauritius
Mississippi Republicans
People from Hattiesburg, Mississippi
American women ambassadors
20th-century American diplomats
20th-century American women
21st-century American women